Havenstein is a German surname. Notable people with the surname include:

Birgit Havenstein (born 1954), German classical flautist and composer
Klaus Havenstein (1922–1998), German actor
Rob Havenstein (born 1992), American football player
Rudolf Havenstein (1857–1923), German lawyer and banker
Walt Havenstein (born 1949), American businessman

German-language surnames